Sundara Purushan may refer to:

 Sundara Purushan (1996 film), a 1996 Tamil film
 Sundara Purushan (2001 film), a 2001 Malayalam language film